Sport Lisboa e Benfica, commonly known as Benfica, is a professional basketball team based in Lisbon, Portugal, who play in the Liga Portuguesa de Basquetebol (LPB), where they are the current champions.  Created in 1927, it is the senior representative side of the basketball section of multi-sports club S.L. Benfica.

In June 2007, the club decided to leave the professional top league, then known as LCB, and join the Proliga, a league organized by the Portuguese Basketball Federation. From 2008 onwards, they returned to the LPB after the federation took over the realms of the competition.

Founded in 1927, Benfica is the most successful Portuguese club, having the record for most championships, cups, league cups, super cups, and other national competitions, with a total of 82 domestic titles. It is also the Portuguese team that advanced the furthest in the European top club championship, now known as EuroLeague.

Some of their most memorable moments were European victories against clubs that have won the Euroleague, such as Virtus Bologna, Real Madrid, Cantù, Cibona, Joventut Badalona, Panathinaikos, Partizan, CSKA Moscow or Varese. Despite basketball not being nearly as popular as football among the Portuguese population, Benfica has a major rivalry with FC Porto in this sport, rivalry which was interrupted from 2012 to 2015.

Along with its several junior teams that play in their respective top division championships, Benfica also has a developmental basketball team, Benfica B, that plays in the Proliga, the second highest tier in Portugal after the LPB, in which the main team competes.

History

Early years
Created on 20 March 1927, the basketball team followed the steps of many other sports that were supported by the club, achieving great success almost immediately. The team established itself as a main contender by the 1940s and during the whole 1960s gained the status of championship favourite and was already the club with the most titles won. By this time the club had won eight national championships and eight cups. This dominating spell decreased the following decade until the early 1980s. In this time-span Benfica could only win two championships, in the 1969–70 and the 1974–75 season, but won four national cups, the second most prestigious Portuguese tournament, in 1969–70, 1971–72, 1972–73 and 1973–74. After these years, Benfica again dominated the national scene.

Golden years
The most successful period of the club was between 1985 and 1995. In eleven seasons, the team won ten national titles, seven of which in a row, five national cups, five league cups and six super cups, achieving the best season ever by a Portuguese basketball team in 1994–95 winning the Portuguese League, Portuguese League Cup, Portuguese Super Cup, Portuguese Basketball Cup and finishing the European Champions' Cup in the Top 16. One of the highlight from that European Champions' Cup season was a 22-point victory (102–80) against CSKA Moscow in Lisbon on 12 January 1995. Benfica also made successful international campaigns in the other seasons considering the budget the team had compared with other European big teams. Some of the most successful of those campaigns include the 1993–94, when Benfica was close to reach the Top 8, and for a third season in a row Benfica managed to reach the Top 16 again in the European Champions' Cup, in 1995–96, grabbing a win against Panathinaikos, the eventual champions.

Decline in the late 1990s
This period was followed by a dark era in which Benfica was internally overshadowed by Ovarense, Portugal Telecom and FC Porto. Even though this period is considered to be a dark one, Benfica did manage to reach the LPB final once as well as winning Super Cups and finishing runners-up in the national cup and in the league cup. Also noteworthy is an away win against Real Madrid, in the 1996–97 EuroCup, the same season the Spaniards won the competition. The team finally decided to withdraw from the top tier and applied for the second league, the Proliga, which was the highest division run by the Federação Portuguesa de Basquetebol. However the first division was folded and the LPB (league) was again being overviewed by the national federation. This allowed the team to make a comeback to the main league.

Revival in the late 2000s
After more than a decade without any titles and in the same season Benfica had made a return to the first league, the 2008–09 season, the team won the Portuguese League, with a perfect score of 100% wins during the regular season, becoming the second team in the world to do so, after Maccabi Tel Aviv in the 1970s, and thrashing Ovarense 4–0 in the best-of-four game final. Benfica won the championship again the following season with a 91% winning record in the regular stage and a 4–1 final against Porto. The recent success brought the team to participate in the EuroChallenge, thus marking the end of a mid-term long hiatus from Portuguese clubs in European basketball competitions. The following year, Benfica won the League Cup and the Super Cup but did not renew the championship as it lost 4–3 in the final to Porto.

Recent years
In the next season Benfica regained the title of Portuguese champion after defeating Porto in their home court Dragão Caixa (53–56) in the last best-of-five series game following a 2–2 playoff tie. Benfica retained the title the following season, having only lost two games, one in the regular season, and the other in the play-off final, which they won 3–1 against Académica de Coimbra, both defeats coming only in overtime. Overall Benfica won every title except the Cup, losing against Vitória de Guimarães in the final, amassing only three losses in the entire season in all competitions. On 23 May 2014, Benfica defeated Vitória de Guimarães (3–0) and conquered its 25th champions title (third consecutive), completing the domestic treble of League, Portuguese Cup and Hugo dos Santos Cup. In this season they won a total of 4 titles (including the 2013 Super Cup).

In the 2014–15 season, Benfica returned to the European competitions, playing in EuroChallenge where they finished in third place of Group E. At domestic level, Benfica won all the five competitions. Starting the 2015–16 season, they won their fifth and fourth consecutive António Pratas Trophy, setting a club record of ten consecutive Portuguese trophies won. They achieved the domestic treble of League Cup, Portuguese Cup, and league title the next season.

In September 2022, Benfica qualified for the regular season of the 2022–23 Basketball Champions League. It was the first time a Portuguese team entered the regular season of the league.

Results in international competition
Note: Benfica score is always listed first.

Home arenas
Benfica played its home basketball games at the Pavilhão dos Desportos, from 1946 to 1965. The club then played its home games at the Pavilhão da Luz, from 1965 to 2003. Since 2003, Benfica has hosted its home games at the Pavilhão Fidelidade, which has a seating capacity of 2,400 people.

Honours

Domestic competitions
 Portuguese League
 Winners (28) – record: 1939–40, 1945–46, 1946–47, 1960–61, 1961–62, 1962–63, 1963–64, 1964–65, 1969–70, 1974–75, 1984–85, 1985–86, 1986–87, 1988–89, 1989–90, 1990–91, 1991–92, 1992–93, 1993–94, 1994–95, 2008–09, 2009–10, 2011–12, 2012–13, 2013–14, 2014–15, 2016–17, 2021–22
 Portuguese Cup
 Winners (22) – record: 1945–46, 1946–47, 1960–61, 1963–64, 1964–65, 1965–66, 1967–68, 1968–69, 1969–70, 1971–72, 1972–73, 1973–74, 1980–81, 1991–92, 1992–93, 1993–94, 1994–95, 1995–96, 2013–14, 2014–15, 2015–16, 2016–17
 League Cup / Hugo dos Santos Cup
 Winners (12) – record: 1989–90, 1990–91, 1992–93, 1993–94, 1994–95, 1995–96, 2010–11, 2012–13, 2013–14, 2014–15, 2016–17, 2017–18
 Portuguese Super Cup
 Winners (14) – record: 1985, 1989, 1991, 1994, 1995, 1996, 1998, 2009, 2010, 2012, 2013, 2014, 2015, 2017
 Troféu António Pratas LPB
 Winners (5) – record: 2008–09, 2011–12, 2012–13, 2014–15, 2015–16
 Troféu António Pratas Proliga
 Winners (1): 2007–08

International competitions
 Supertaça da Lusofonia
 Winners (1): 2010

Players

Current roster

Retired numbers

Former players
Players who won a league title with Benfica or who were picked in the NBA draft.

  Bruce Holland (4 seasons: 1977–81)
  Henrique Vieira (11 seasons: 1981–92)
  Carlos Lisboa (12 seasons: 1984–96)
  Mike Plowden (10 seasons: 1985–95)
  Jean-Jacques Conceição (8 seasons: 1988–96)
  Pedro Miguel (11 seasons: 1989–2000)
  José Carlos Guimarães (4 seasons: 1991–94, 1996–97)
  Steve Rocha (4 seasons: 1992–95, 1996–97)
  Carlos Seixas (7 seasons: 1992–99)
  Torgeir Bryn (1 season: 1994–95)
  Luís Silva (8 seasons: 1994–99, 2002–05)
  Sérgio Ramos (8 seasons: 1995–99, 2008–12)
  Brian Rewers (1 season: 1997–98)
  Mark Acres (1 season: 1997–98)
  Jamal Faulkner (3 seasons: 1997–99)
  Jamie Watson (1 season: 2002–03)
  Tomás Jofresa (1 season: 2003–04)
  Ben Davis (1 season: 2005–06)
  Ashante Johnson (3 seasons: 2005–07)
  Carlos Andrade (7 seasons: 2006–07, 2012–18)
  Corey Benjamin (1 season: 2006–07)
  Geno Carlisle (1 season: 2006–07)
  Tyson Wheeler (1 season: 2006–07)
  Miguel Minhava (7 seasons: 2006–13)
  Edson Ferreira (1 season: 2008–09)
  Rahein Brown (1 season: 2008–09)
  Seth Doliboa (5 seasons: 2008–09, 2011–2015)
  Cristóvão Cordeiro (2 seasons: 2008–10)
  João Santos (2 seasons: 2008–10)
  Miguel Barroca (2 seasons: 2008–10)
  António Tavares (3 seasons: 2008–11)
  Ben Reed (4 seasons: 2008–12)
  Diogo Carreira (8 seasons: 2008–16)
  Nick DeWitz (1 season: 2009–10)
  Will Frisby (1 season: 2009–10)
  Elvis Évora (4 seasons: 2009–13)
  Heshimu Evans (4 seasons: 2009–13)
  Carlos Ferreirinho (6 seasons: 2010–16)
  António Monteiro (1 season: 2011–12)
  Marcus Norris (1 season: 2011–12)
  Ted Scott (1 season: 2011–12)
  Fred Gentry (5 seasons: 2011–16)
  Lace Dunn (1 season: 2012–13)
  Ricky Franklin (1 season: 2012–13)
  Cláudio Fonseca (4 seasons: 2012–16)
  David Weaver  (1 season: 2013–14)
  Artur Castela (2 seasons: 2013–16)
  Jobey Thomas (3 seasons: 2013–15)
  Mário Gil Fernandes (4 seasons: 2013–17)
  Ron Slay (1 season: 2014–15)
  Fábio Lima (4 seasons: 2014–15, 2018–21)
  Daequan Cook (1 season: 2015–16)
  Marko Loncovic (2 seasons: 2015–17)
  Nuno Oliveira (3 seasons: 2015–18)
  Derek Raivio (1 season: 2016–17)
  Carlos Morais (2 seasons: 2016–18)
  Neemias Queta (1 season: 2017–18)
  Quincy Miller (1 season: 2020–21)

Head coaches

  Teotónio Lima (12 seasons: 1956–65, 1972–75)
  José Curado (3 seasons: 1984–87)
  Tim Shea (3 seasons: 1988–91)
  Mário Palma (6 seasons: 1991–97)
  Carlos Lisboa (10 seasons: 1997–99, 2011–17, 2019–21)
  Norberto Alves (2004–06, 2021–present)
  Henrique Vieira (5 seasons: 2007–11)
  José Ricardo (1 season: 2017–18)
  Arturo Álvarez (1 season: 2018–19)

Women's honours
 Portuguese League
 Winners (2): 2020–21, 2021–22
 Portuguese Cup
 Winners (2): 2020–21, 2021–22
 Federation Cup 
 Winners (2): 2021–22, 2022–23
 Vítor Hugo Cup Winners (2): 2019–20, 2022–23
 Portuguese Super Cup Winners (2):''' 2021, 2022

References

Further reading

External links
  

 
Basketball
Basketball teams established in 1927
Basketball teams in Portugal
1927 establishments in Portugal